Dejan Stojanović (born 19 July 1993) is a professional footballer who plays as a goalkeeper for 2. Bundesliga side SSV Jahn Regensburg. Born in Austria, he is a former youth international for North Macedonia.

Club career
Stojanović made 23 league appearances for FC Lustenau 07 in the 2010–11 season after initially starting the season as the backup keeper. He took over as the Lustenau starting keeper in the 13th round of the Austrian First League and started the next 23 games before he was rested in the final league game of the season.

On 21 January 2015, he signed for Serie B club F.C. Crotone on loan from Bologna until the end of the season.

On 31 August 2016, Stojanović signed for Swiss club FC St. Gallen on a one-year deal.

He moved to an English club for the first time on 16 January 2020, joining Middlesbrough on a three-and-a-half year contract.

On 5 January 2021, Stojanovic joined 2. Bundesliga side FC St. Pauli on loan until 30 June 2021.

On 31 December 2021, Stojanovic joined 2. Bundesliga side FC Ingolstadt 04 on loan for the remainder of the season.

International career
Stojanović was called up to the Macedonia national under-21 team and played in a friendly match against Montenegro U-21 in 2011. In the same year, he accepted the call from Austria U-19 and was named on subs bench for the three 2012 UEFA European Under-19 Football Championship qualification matches.

Career statistics

References

External links
 
 Profile at bundesliga.at 
 Macedonian Football

1993 births
Living people
People from Feldkirch, Vorarlberg
Austrian people of Macedonian descent
Macedonian people of Serbian descent
Austrian people of Serbian descent
Association football goalkeepers
Austrian footballers
Macedonian footballers
Footballers from Vorarlberg
North Macedonia under-21 international footballers
FC Lustenau players
Bologna F.C. 1909 players
F.C. Crotone players
FC St. Gallen players
Middlesbrough F.C. players
FC St. Pauli players
FC Ingolstadt 04 players
SSV Jahn Regensburg players
2. Bundesliga players
2. Liga (Austria) players
Serie A players
Serie B players
Swiss Super League players
English Football League players
Macedonian expatriate footballers
Austrian expatriate footballers
Expatriate footballers in Italy
Macedonian expatriate sportspeople in Italy
Austrian expatriate sportspeople in Italy
Expatriate footballers in Switzerland
Macedonian expatriate sportspeople in Switzerland
Austrian expatriate sportspeople in Switzerland
Expatriate footballers in England
Macedonian expatriate sportspeople in England
Expatriate footballers in Germany
Macedonian expatriate sportspeople in Germany